Regierungsbezirk Zichenau was a Regierungsbezirk, or administrative region, of the Nazi German Province of East Prussia in 1939–45. The regional capital was Zichenau (Ciechanów). It was also referred to under the designation of South East Prussia (German: Südostpreußen) which, however, was later sometimes also applied to Bialystok District, although the latter was not incorporated into, but merely attached to East Prussia.

History
The government region was created on 26 October 1939, out of Polish areas annexed by Nazi Germany during World War II. The region had an area of 12,000 km2 and a population of approximately 895,000, including 800,000 Poles, 80,000 Jews, and 15,000 Germans.

Regierungsbezirk Zichenau was dissolved in 1945 when East Prussia was overrun by the Soviet Red Army. The territory was then restored to Poland.

Rural districts
 Mackeim district (Maków Mazowiecki)
 Mielau district (Mława)
 Ostenburg district (Pułtusk)
 Plöhnen district (Płońsk)
 Praschnitz district (Przasnysz)
 Scharfenwiese district (Ostrołęka)
 Schröttersburg district (Płock)
 Sichelberg district (Sierpc)
 Zichenau district (Ciechanów)

References

1939 establishments in Poland
1945 disestablishments in Poland
Government regions of Prussia
Poland in World War II
Subdivisions of Nazi Germany
World War II occupied territories
Polish areas annexed by Nazi Germany
States and territories disestablished in 1945